Hit-Girl (Mindy McCready) is a fictional antihero appearing in the comic series Kick-Ass: The Dave Lizewski Years series, published by Marvel Comics under the company's imprint Icon Comics and later Image Comics.  The character was created by artist John Romita Jr. and writer Mark Millar.  She is a young but effective vigilante, trained by her father Damon McCready (a.k.a. Big Daddy) from an early age to be a costumed superhero and assassin.  In Kick-Ass, she is introduced as a supporting character. She featured in her own self-titled comic book series, Hit-Girl,  which was first published on February 21, 2018 by Image Comics.  She is portrayed by Chloë Grace Moretz in the feature film adaptations Kick-Ass and Kick Ass 2.

Comics

Kick Ass: The Dave Lizewski Years

Following her father's death in the first volume of the comic The Dave Lizewski Years, Hit-Girl takes on Kick-Ass (Dave Lizewski) as her crime-fighting partner in the second and third volumes, training him and using him to hunt criminals together with her. She also gets him to teach her how to be a normal kid, and get along with other girls somewhat older than herself. After she is arrested at the conclusion of the third volume, she breaks herself out of prison, and, joining back together with Kick-Ass, takes out the entirety of the Genovese crime family and their accomplices, before taking on a new Kick-Ass as her sidekick.

Hit-Girl

Hit-Girl returns in the new series following the events of The Dave Lizewski Years in which she goes on worldwide hunting down criminals.

Kick-Ass: The New Girl
Although Hit-Girl is yet to actually appear in Kick-Ass: The New Girl, a variant cover for the first and fifth issues of the series features her (Hit-Girl) in combat with the Patience Lee incarnation of Kick-Ass. A cross-over between the two series is initiated when Hit-Girl is made aware of Patience's activities, prompting her to return to the US.

Kick-Ass vs. Hit-Girl
The five-issue series depicting the confrontation between Hit-Girl and Patience Lee went into publication on November 11, 2020.

Crossover

An adult Hit-Girl first appears in the sixth issue of Crossover after being dragged into another reality by "The Event", partaking in an endless battle between residents of the Marvel, DC, and Image Universes (amongst characters from many other properties by Image Comics, Dark Horse Comics, Skybound Entertainment and Boom! Studios, including The Wicked + The Divine and I Hate Fairyland), saving Otto and Ellie before jumping into another battle.

Films
The character, named in the end credits as Mindy Macready, appears in the 2010 film adaptation Kick-Ass, and the 2013 sequel Kick-Ass 2. Jane Goldman, one of the two co-writers of the first film's script, said, "We just really wanted Hit-Girl to be a character who, in a sense, simply happens to be an eleven-year-old girl, in the same way that Ripley in Alien could have been a guy but the part happened to be played by Sigourney Weaver." Goldman said that Mindy "is genuinely dangerous, she's genuinely mad. It's not her fault: she's been raised in this environment where she doesn't know anything different. She's unwittingly part of a folie à deux." When asked if Hit-Girl could be considered a feminist heroine, Goldman said "Yeah... she's a feminist hero by token of the fact that she pays no attention to gender stereotypes. I think she also doesn't want special treatment because she's a girl."

Casting

In 2008, shortly before the release of the film Wanted, 11-year-old actress Chloë Grace Moretz saw posters of Angelina Jolie for the film while riding with her mother in Los Angeles, prompting her to ask for a role that she described as "an Angelina Jolie-type character" and "like an action hero, woman empowerment, awesome, take-charge leading role".  One month later, she was offered the role of Mindy Macready/Hit-Girl.

Matthew Vaughn, commenting on the maturity of Moretz, said that because she has four older brothers, she was no stranger to much of the language in the script. Moretz said that it was entertaining to illustrate the differences between Mindy and her superheroine identity "for me, 'cause it's almost like an alternate personality". Lewis Wallace of Wired said that Mindy "gets all the good lines, capping every Tarantino-scale bloodletting with a foul-mouthed joke". Christopher Mintz-Plasse, the actor who portrays Red Mist, said that "we (Kick-Ass and Red Mist) don't have any of the action in the movie. It's all Hit-Girl". Vaughn said that Hit-Girl is a part of "the ultimate father-daughter relationship, where Barbie dolls are replaced with knives, and unicorns become hand grenades".

To prepare for her role, Moretz took months of training in learning how to handle guns and to use butterfly knives and swords.  Moretz stated that the shooting of the action scenes was arduous. Goldman said that the aspect of the film adaptation that excited her the most was adapting Hit-Girl's storyline to the film. Millar said he expected the character to receive mostly negative reception, "But the movie was so well made, I think, that people were quietly charmed by her for the most part. The only really negative thing we saw came from Roger Ebert and others from his generation who were upset, but there were those especially here in the United Kingdom [who] went crazy for her".  Millar added he and Vaughn "were quite surprised about that. We were expecting the worst, that people were going to say she was amoral and we [in turn] were going to get killed for her.  But it was much more of a case where people were positive about Hit-Girl even saying she was empowering female character".

Controversy
In January 2010, an uncensored preview clip from the first film was criticized by family advocacy groups for its display of violence and use of the line "Okay, you cunts, let's see what you can do now", delivered by Chloë Grace Moretz, who was barely twelve years old at the time of filming.  Australian Family Association spokesman John Morrissey claimed that "the language [was] offensive and the values inappropriate; without the saving grace of the bloodless victory of traditional superheroes". Several critics accused the film of glorifying violence, particularly violence by young children.

In response to the controversy, Moretz stated in an interview, "If I ever uttered one word that I said in Kick-Ass, I would be grounded for years!  I'd be stuck in my room until I was 20! I would never in a million years say that.  I'm an average, everyday girl."  Moretz has said that while filming, she could not bring herself to say the film's title out loud in interviews, instead calling it "the film" in public and "Kick-Butt" at home. Christopher Mintz-Plasse expressed surprise that people were angry about the language but did not seem to be offended that Hit-Girl violently kills many people on-screen.

Solo film discussions
In January 2015, Millar revealed to IGN that there was a planned Hit-Girl film with Gareth Evans directing but that it was cancelled.

However, in June 2015, Matthew Vaughn discussed a possibility of rebooting the Kick-Ass franchise with a Hit-Girl & Big Daddy prequel film to revive interest in the franchise.  He stated that, "If we make that, hopefully that will be the sorbet for the people that didn't like Kick-Ass 2 and then we can go off and make Kick-Ass 3. I think we've got to do this prequel to regain the love that we had with Kick-Ass."

Video games
Hit-Girl appear as a playable character in Kick-Ass: The Game and Kick-Ass 2: The Game, each respectively based on the two films.

Toys
In 2010, Mezco released Hit-Girl figures based on the movie and followed-up with new figures released in 2013 by Neca.

Skills and abilities
Mindy is an expert martial artist and proficient with a wide variety of melee weapons. She has proven herself capable of defeating large groups of armed thugs wielding only a pair of swords or a double-bladed pole-arm. She is also an excellent markswoman and proficient with practically all firearms from pistols to automatic rifles. Mindy has proven herself adept at stealth and evasion being able to infiltrate a maximum security prison with ease. She is also an expert driver with her vehicle of choice being a custom high-powered motorcycle. The nature of Big Daddy's training has made Hit-Girl a particularly brutal and remorseless character who does not flinch at torture or dispatching her opponents in the most gruesome and painful ways possible. In fact she can be so intimidating that when she was briefly imprisoned she was soon the undisputed ruler of the adult penitentiary where she was held despite being a twelve-year-old girl. Mindy's one weakness, as pointed out by Mother Russia, is that her strength is limited by her youth which can cause an over-reliance on her weapons skills to compensate. Indeed, Mother Russia seemed to be more than a match for Hit-Girl at hand-to-hand combat with the young vigilante winning their fight mostly through the intervention of chance.

Personality
As a vigilante who regularly kills her opponent in violent fashion, Mindy displays not only the skill to carry out dangerous acts with high-level precision, but the emotional detachment and desensitized temperament necessary to do so. For example, when, in the comic book version, Kick-Ass tells her that her father was just murdered, she responds by saying, "Finish the job, mourn later." She also exhibits other habits and demeanors more typically seen in adults who are hardened killers. She curses regularly and makes crude jokes, often adopting a sarcastic demeanor towards her crime-fighting partner/apprentice Kick-Ass, who describes her as resembling a mix between John Rambo and Polly Pocket. Despite the violent nature of her crime-fighting, and her ability to carry out such activities without apparent difficulty or remorse, Mindy also has an interest in things typical of young people, such as Hello Kitty, comic books, Clint Eastwood and John Woo movies.  However, when the villain Johnny G is finally dead at the end of The Dave Lizewski Years Book One, she turns to Kick-Ass and asks him for a hug, covered in tears and blood, as she mourns her father.

Notes

References

External links

  Woerner, Meredith (April 12, 2010). "Hit-Girl Responds To The Outrage Against Her Teenage Ultra-Violence". io9
 Rich, Katey (2010). "Getting Away With Hit Girl: How Kick-Ass Lets You Root For An Adolescent Killer". CinemaBlend.

Characters created by John Romita Jr.
Characters created by Mark Millar
Child characters in comics
Child characters in film
Comics characters introduced in 2008
Marvel Comics sidekicks
Fictional characters from New York (state)
Fictional child soldiers
Fictional female swordfighters
Fictional knife-fighters
Fictional gunfighters in comics
Fictional hybrid martial artists
Fictional mass murderers
Fictional terrorists
Marvel Comics orphans
Fictional swordfighters in comics
Fictional women soldiers and warriors
Image Comics superheroes
Kick-Ass (franchise)
Superhero film characters
Child superheroes
Marvel Comics child superheroes
Marvel Comics female superheroes
Marvel Comics martial artists
Vigilante characters in comics